Imunga Ivanga (born 1967 in Libreville, Gabon) is a Gabonese filmmaker.

He was born in 1967 in Libreville, Gabon. He studied at University of Libreville and has a masters in literature. Also, he speaks several languages like Mpongwe, French, English, Spanish and Italian. After a year studying film at the FEMIS in Paris, he specialised in script-writing and in 1996 obtained his degree. Also, he is a prolific writer and he has written several scripts for short films, clips and documentaries.

References

1967 births
Living people
Gabonese screenwriters
People from Libreville
21st-century Gabonese people